F&M may refer to:

F&M Brewery, a microbrewery in Guelph, Ontario, Canada
Fortnum & Mason, an upmarket department store in London, England
Franklin & Marshall College, a liberal arts college in Pennsylvania, USA
F&M, a drugstore chain formerly owned by Drug Emporium
F & M, a 2019 album by German-Swedish duo Lindemann
Fujiya & Miyagi, an English electronic music band
Foot-and-mouth disease

See also
FM (disambiguation)
F&M Bank (disambiguation)